Snelling & Dayton is a bus rapid transit station on the Metro A Line in Saint Paul, Minnesota.

The station is located at the intersection of Dayton Avenue on Snelling Avenue, just south of Marshall Avenue. Both station platforms are located near-side of Dayton Avenue. The METRO B Line, an upcoming bus rapid transit line, is planned to share existing station infrastructure. The B Line is currently in early planning stages, and is expected to begin operation 2022 between Uptown, Minneapolis and Downtown Saint Paul.

The station opened June 11, 2016 with the rest of the A Line.

Bus connections
 Route 21 – Uptown – Lake Street – Midway – Selby Avenue
 Route 53 – Limited Stop – Uptown – Lake Street – Marshall Avenue
 Route 84 – Snelling Avenue – Highland Village – Sibley Plaza
Connections to local bus Route 21 and limited-stop Route 53 can be made on Marshall Avenue at Fry Street. Route 84 shares platforms with the A Line.

Places nearby
Union Park, Saint Paul
Carbucks

References

External links 
 Metro Transit: Snelling & Dayton Station

Bus stations in Minnesota